Chris Hayes is a Canadian skydiver.  Hayes is noted for having won the bronze medal in speed canopy piloting at the first Canopy Piloting World Parachuting Championships in Vienna, Austria in 2006.

References

External links 
 Canadian Sport Parachuting Association - Web page describing Hayes' medal at the Canopy Piloting World Parachuting Championships.

Place of birth missing (living people)
Year of birth missing (living people)
Living people
Canadian skydivers